A tussenvoegsel in a Dutch name is a family name affix positioned between a person's given name and the main part of their family name. There are similar concepts in many languages, such as Celtic family name prefixes, French particles, and the German von.

Greg de Vries, meaning "the". A  forms an integral part of one's surname; it distinguishes it from similar Dutch surnames, e.g. Jan de Boer compared to Albert Boer; Frits de Kok compared to Wim Kok.

History 
 originate from the time that Dutch surnames officially came into use. Many of the names are place names, which refer to cities, e.g. Van Coevorden ("from Coevorden"), or geographical locations, e.g. Van de Velde ("of the fields"). The list of  mentioned below includes approximate translations, some of which have maintained their earlier meaning more than others.

Usage

Netherlands 
In the Netherlands, these  are not included when sorting alphabetically. For example, in the Dutch telephone directory, "De Vries" is listed under "V", instead of "D". Therefore,  in Dutch databases are recorded as a separate data field so as to simplify the process of locating it. Sorting by  would result in many names being listed under "D" and "V".

So referring to a professor named Peter whose surname is "de Vries", one writes "professor De Vries", but when preceded by a first name or initial it is written using lower case, such as in "Peter de Vries" or "P. de Vries".

Belgium 
In Belgian Dutch, or Flemish, surnames are collated with the full surname including . "De Smet" comes before "DeSmet" in a telephone book. Although French family names commonly also use , those are frequently contracted into the surname, e.g. turning Le Roc into Leroc, or La Roche into Laroche, and thus explaining the collation preference.

In contrast to Dutch orthography, Belgian  always keep their original orthography, e.g.

Other areas 
In areas outside the Low Countries,  are typically capitalized and used in sorting (as in Belgium). Sometimes a surname of this sort will retain capital letters for each of the component words, such as "DeJong", "VanHerck", or even "VanDerBeek". Dutch family names in South Africa, e.g. Van der Merwe, follow Dutch rules.

Examples 

Common  are as follows:
  – "at"
  – "near"
  – "the"; also French and Spanish for "of"
  – "of the"
  – "the"
  – "in"
  – "under", "below"
  – "on", "at"
  – "over", "beyond"
  – "of the", "from" (genitive)
  – "at"
  – "'till"
  – "from", "out of"
  – "from"
  – "to"

Combinations are also common:

See also 
 List of Dutch family names

References

External links 
 

 
Dutch words and phrases